Cults of Terror is a tabletop role-playing game supplement for RuneQuest, originally published by Chaosium in 1981. The sourcebook details nine evil deities and the cults that worship them, for use in Greg Stafford's fantasy world of Glorantha.

Publication history
Originally published as a softback book by Chaosium in 1981. It was republished in 2002 by Moon Design Publications in a single volume with Cults of Prax as Glorantha Classics Volume 3, Cult Compendium, as a hardback with a dustcover and softback, it was republished as a PDF in 2010. The 1981 edition was republished in 2016 in PDF format as part of Chaosium's RuneQuest: Classic Edition Kickstarter.

Shannon Appelcline explained that "Though some of RuneQuest's first supplements were simple dungeon crawls and stat books, many others were groundbreaking. Cults of Prax (1979) and Cults of Terror (1981) gave precise details on the worship of a few dozen gods within the world of Glorantha, further delving into the depths of RuneQuest'''s sophisticated religions."

Contents
 Introduction - How Gloranthan cults work, maps, a pronunciation guide and The Reminiscences of Paulis Longvale, an in-world document detailing a region called Dorastor.
 History And Cosmology By Greg Stafford. An 11 page Gloranthan guide.
 Primal Chaos By Ken Kaufer
 Mallia By Anders Swenson
 Bagog By Charlie Krank And John Natzke
 Thed By Sandy Petersen
 Vivamort By Sean Summers
 Thanatar By Jennell Jaquays
 The Crimson Bat By Rudy Kraft
 Krarsht By John Natzke, Lynn Willis, and Charlie Krank
 Nysalor/Gbaji By Greg Stafford

Reception
Ron Pehr reviewed Cults of Terror in The Space Gamer No. 42. Pehr commented that "if you play RuneQuest, or even if you just want to see what an excellent game aid can be, you'll buy Cults of Terror."

Oliver Dickinson reviewed Cults of Terror for White Dwarf #34, giving it an overall rating of 6 out of 10, and stated that "For GMs who set their campaigns in Glorantha and use the RuneQuest religious structures and cosmology, and for all those who wish to know more of this fascinating world, this book is essential reading."

Reviews
 Different Worlds'' #17 (Dec., 1981)

Notes

References

External links
 

Role-playing game supplements introduced in 1981
RuneQuest 2nd edition supplements